Woman Without Tears (Spanish: La mujer sin lágrimas) is a 1951 Mexican historical drama film directed by Alfredo B. Crevenna and starring Libertad Lamarque, Marga López and Ernesto Alonso.

Cast

References

Bibliography 
 Darlene J. Sadlier. Latin American Melodrama: Passion, Pathos, and Entertainment. University of Illinois Press, 2009.

External links 
 

1951 films
1950s historical drama films
Mexican historical drama films
1950s Spanish-language films
Films directed by Alfredo B. Crevenna
Films set in the 19th century
1951 drama films
Mexican black-and-white films
1950s Mexican films